Dorit Levinstein (born in 1956) is a sculptor and painter. She is best known for her unique approach to working with painted bronze sculptures, which incorporate aspects of Chinese philosophy and its relation to movement and immediate environments. Levinstein’s sculptures have been exhibited worldwide including at The Royal Academy (London).

Career

After graduating from the Technion School of Technology in 1978 where she received a degree in graphic design with a concentration in illustration, Levinstein continued studying painting and sculpture at the Avni Institute of Art and Design. From 1985 to 1988 Levinstein taught art at the Avni Institute of Art and Design and in 1988 she was awarded a prize for excellence by the Soho Gallery in New York.

In 1989 Levinstein started to experiment with new artistic approaches, synthesizing painting and sculpture and developing a unique style where she could project contradictory aspects of her own personality. This process led her to create several works in painted wood and aluminum. This gradually developed into the painted bronze sculptures she is currently known for. In the book "Sculptures of Dorit Levinstein" by author Miriam Smilan, Levinstein described her approach to her work: "I don't make any preliminary sketches. I work intuitively in my studio ‘drawing’ three-dimensional figures in space. Intense concentration is required. In a way, it's like a choreography of matter. All the information and details needed must be included in one continuous, flowing line." 

Levinstein’s work can be found in private collections around the world, and is exhibited in many prominent galleries in cities including New York, Lyon, San Francisco, Jerusalem, Tel Aviv, Singapore, Palma de Mallorca, Berlin, Hamburg, Istanbul, Verbier, Nuenen, Munich, Paris, Kuala Lumpur, Hertfordshire, Saint Tropez, Geneva, Bordeaux, Forte Dei Marmi, Düsseldorf, Saint Tropez, Konstanz, Bordeaux, Marseille, Chicago, New Delhi, and many others. She has also produced several indoor and outdoor commissioned works for numerous municipalities and locations worldwide, including the Hotel Majestic Barrière, The Plaza Athénée, The New York Palace Hotel, and many others.

Style and influences

Levinstein has been influenced over the years by artists such as Cezanne, Gaudi, Klimt and Niki de Saint Phalle as well as American Pop Artists and Modern sculptors. Her sculptural work is identified by three main periods: 'The Classical Bronze Period', 'The Stone and Mixed Media', and the current 'Colorful Linear Figures' made mostly of bronze and also of aluminum. One of the main features of her works are their colorful patterns and delicate lines.

Significant works
I LOVE ICONS COLLECTION
 MARILYN MONROE
 FRIDA KAHLO WITH A RED BOW
 MICHAEL JACKSON
 BART SIMPSON
 BARBIE
 ELVIS
 WOODY ALLEN
 LOUIS ARMSTRONG
 AMY WINEHOUSE
 QUEEN ELIZABETH
 CHE GUEVARA
 DAME EDNA
 BUDDHA
 STATUE OF LIBERTY
 THE BEATLES
STUDYING THE MASTERS COLLECTION
 THE RIDER
 PICASSO DOVE
 FLUTIST
 MOTHER AND CHILD
 VENUS
 FRIDA WITH A RED BOW
 FRIDA
 WOMAN WITH A HAT
 SUNFLOWERS
 MATISSE DANCERS
 RENOIR DANCERS
 L'HOMME QUI MARCHE
 NIKE
CHARACTERS COLLECTION
 TANGO
 LA CUMPARISTA
 SALSA
 FAMILY
 SWING
 WINNER
 SWEET KISS
 JUGGLER
 BIKER
 FAN LADY
 POKER FACE
ANIMALS COLLECTION
 ROYAL KISS
 LOVE STORY
 BUTTERFLY
 PRAYING MANTIS
 HOOD HOOD
 COW
 FLAMINGO
 EDEN BIRD
 BIG BIRD
 PEACE DOVE
 PEGASUS
 OWL
 LION KING
 SHEEP
 REX THE DOG
 COUPLE OF DOGS
 DEAR DEER
 WORKING GIRL
 SLOW MOTION
 EAGLE
 ROOSTER
 SPIRAL FISH
 LUCKY FISH
 AQUARIUM
TYPOGRAPHIC COLLECTION
 LOVE
 @RT
 STAR
 HA HA HA
 AMOR
 ART
ZODIAC COLLECTION
 ARIES
 TAURUS
 GEMINI
 CANCER
 LEO
 VIRGO
 LIBRA
 SCORPIO
 SAGITTARIUS
 CAPRICORN
 AQUARIUS
 PISCES

See also
Visual arts in Israel
List of public art in Israel

References

External links
 Official website
 Dorit Levinstein's artist page on Eden Fine Art website

1956 births
Living people